Forms of the United States War Department, Office of the Chief of Ordnance, are handbooks, descriptions, instructions, that would later be called  technical manuals (TM's): a technical description of a cannon, machine-gun, rifle, pistol, revolver, some wagons and trucks belonging to the artillery and ammunition, also some field manuals (FM's).
The forms have their own numbers, at least through no. 2050.

List

See also
United States Army Ordnance Corps
List of numbered documents of the United States Department of War

References

External links
Hathitrust online library

Liberated Manuals
Archive.org online library

United States Department of War publications
United States Army publications
United States Army lists
World War I artillery of the United States